Count Cohn (German: Graf Cohn) is a 1923 German silent film directed by Carl Boese and starring Hermann Vallentin, Frida Richard and Bernd Aldor.

The film's sets were designed by the art director Kurt Richter.

Cast
 Hermann Vallentin as Siegfried Cohn 
 Frida Richard as Frau Cohn 
 Bernd Aldor as Isidor 
 Elisabeth Pinajeff as Recha 
 Grete Hollmann as Eva 
 Rudolf Lettinger as Christian Schmidt 
 Fritz Richard as Dr. Krause 
 Olga Engl as Gräfin Thekla Holm 
 Xenia Desni as Comtesse Dora 
 Johannes Riemann as Baron Heinz von Sternau 
 Albert Patry as Graf v. Klettingen 
 Willy Kaiser-Heyl as Verlagsbuchhändler v. Gellert 
 Max Willenz as Buchhalter Weller

References

Bibliography
 Bock, Hans-Michael & Bergfelder, Tim. The Concise CineGraph. Encyclopedia of German Cinema. Berghahn Books, 2009.

External links

1923 films
Films of the Weimar Republic
Films directed by Carl Boese
German silent feature films
German black-and-white films
Films based on German novels